Anumeta hilgerti is a moth of the family Noctuidae first described by Rothschild in 1909. It is found from Morocco to the Arabian Peninsula.

There is one generation per year. Adults are on wing from February to May.

Subspecies
Anumeta hilgerti hilgerti
Anumeta hilgerti popovi (Israel)

External links

Image

Toxocampina
Moths of Africa
Moths of the Middle East